The Transitional French cabinet of 1839 was announced on 31 March 1839 by King Louis Philippe I.
It replaced the Second cabinet of Louis Mathieu Molé.  

On 12 May 1839 there was an insurrection in Paris, suppressed by the National Guard and regular troops.
The ministry was replaced that day by the Second cabinet of Nicolas Jean-de-Dieu Soult.

Ministers
The cabinet was created by ordinance of 31 March 1839. It did not include a president of the council of ministers.
The ministers were:
 Interior: Adrien de Gasparin
 Foreign Affairs: Louis Napoléon Lannes, Duke of Montebello
 Justice and Religious Affairs: Amédée Girod de l'Ain
 War: Amédée Despans-Cubières
 Finance: Jean-Élie Gautier
 Navy and Colonies: Jean Tupinier
 Public Education: Narcisse Parant
 Public Works, Agriculture and Commerce: Adrien de Gasparin

References

Sources

French governments
1839 establishments in France
1839 disestablishments in France
Cabinets established in 1839
Cabinets disestablished in 1839